Maharaja Bir Bikram Kishore Manikya Debbarma Bahadur  (19 August 1908 – 17 May 1947) was a king (or Maharaja) of Tripura State.

He was succeeded by his son, Maharaja Kirit Bikram Kishore Deb Barman, who was the nominal king for two years till the state's merger into India in 1949. Since he was a minor during this time, the state was governed by a Council of Regency headed by his mother.

Legacy

Bir Bikram Institution (School), Tripura, Dharmanagar
Maharaja Bir Bikram College
Maharaja Bir Bikram University
Maharaja Bir Bikram Airport, Agartala

Bir Bikram Kishore Manikya Era

Tripura King Bir Bikram Kishore Manikya Bahadur was popularly known as the "Architect of Tripura" due to his contribution to educational institutions. 

King reserved lands for the indigenous people whose outcome is said to be the present TTAADC (Tripura Tribal Area Autonomous District Councils) area.

Titles
1908-1909: Prince Kishore
1909-1923: Srila-Srijukta Bir Bikram Kishore Deb Barman Jubaraj Goswami Bahadur
1923-1935: His Highness Bisam-Samar-Bijojee Mahamopadhyaya Radhakrishnapada Pancha-Srijukta Maharaja Sri Sri Sri Bir Bikram Kishore Deb Barman Manikya Bahadur, Maharaja of Tripura
1935-1937: His Highness Bisam-Samar-Bijojee Mahamopadhyaya Radhakrishnapada Pancha-Srijukta Maharaja Sri Sri Sri Sir Bir Bikram Kishore Deb Barman Manikya Bahadur, Maharaja of Tripura, KCSI
1937-1942: Captain His Highness Bisam-Samar-Bijojee Mahamopadhyaya Radhakrishnapada Pancha-Srijukta Maharaja Sri Sri Sri Sir Bir Bikram Kishore Deb Barman Manikya Bahadur, Maharaja of Tripura, KCSI
1942-1944: Major His Highness Bisam-Samar-Bijojee Mahamopadhyaya Radhakrishnapada Pancha-Srijukta Maharaja Sri Sri Sri Sir Bir Bikram Kishore Deb Barman Manikya Bahadur, Maharaja of Tripura, KCSI
1944-1946: Lieutenant-Colonel His Highness Bisam-Samar-Bijojee Mahamopadhyaya Radhakrishnapada Pancha-Srijukta Maharaja Sri Sri Sri Sir Bir Bikram Kishore Deb Barman Manikya Bahadur, Maharaja of Tripura, KCSI
1946-1947: Colonel His Highness Bisam-Samar-Bijojee Mahamopadhyaya Radhakrishnapada Pancha-Srijukta Maharaja Sri Sri Sri Sir Bir Bikram Kishore Deb Barman Manikya Bahadur, Maharaja of Tripura, GBE, KCSI

Honours

(Ribbon bar, as it would look today)

King George V Silver Jubilee Medal, 1935
Knight Commander of the Order of the Star of India, 1935
1939-1945 Star-1945
Burma Star-1945
War Medal 1939-1945 -1945
Knight Grand Cross of the Order of the British Empire, 1946

Source 
  
 
 
 

Kings of Tripura
Hindu monarchs
Indian Knights Grand Cross of the Order of the British Empire
Knights Commander of the Order of the Star of India
1908 births
1947 deaths
Indian knights
Indian royalty
People from Agartala